North Georgia Astronomical Observatory  is an astronomical observatory owned and operated by University of North Georgia.  It is located in Dahlonega, Georgia (USA).

See also 
List of observatories

References
 .

External links
North Georgia Astronomical Observatory Clear Sky Clock
University of North Georgia Observatory

Astronomical observatories in Georgia (U.S. state)
Buildings and structures in Lumpkin County, Georgia
Education in Lumpkin County, Georgia
Tourist attractions in Lumpkin County, Georgia